Great Falls is a census-designated place (CDP) in Fairfax County, Virginia, United States.  The population as of the 2010 census was 15,427, an increase of 80.5% from the 2000 census.

History
Colonial farm settlements began to form in the area as early as the late 1700s.

Early on, the village was known as Forestville (unofficially, since there was already a Forestville with a Post Office), but was renamed Great Falls in 1955.

Geography

Great Falls lies in the Piedmont upland on the right bank of the Potomac River. The Potomac River forms the northern and eastern borders of the CDP, and several of its tributaries flow north and east through the CDP. From north to south, these include Nichols Run, Clarks Branch, and Difficult Run. Difficult Run (along with Leesburg Pike) forms the southern border of the CDP. Two of its tributaries, Captain Hickory Run and Piney Run, flow southeast through the southern part of the CDP. The Great Falls of the Potomac River, the community's namesake, are on the east side of the CDP.

As a suburb of Washington, D.C., Great Falls is a part of both the Washington Metropolitan Area and the larger Baltimore-Washington Metropolitan Area. It is bordered on all sides by other Washington suburbs, including: Darnestown and Travilah, Maryland to the north, Potomac, Maryland to the east, McLean to the southeast, Wolf Trap to the south, Reston and Dranesville to the southwest, Sterling to the west, and Lowes Island to the northwest.

Demographics

As of the 2010 census, there were 15,427 people, 4,977 households, and 4,439 families residing in the CDP. The racial makeup of the community was 80.5% White, 13.5% Asian, 1.8% African American, 0.1% American Indian, 0.0% Pacific Islander, 0.6% from other races, and 3.4% from two or more races. Hispanics and Latinos of any race were 3.9% of the population.

There were 4,977 households, of which 46.1% had children under the age of 18 living with them, 82.1% were married couples living together, 4.7% had a female householder with no husband present, and 10.8% were non-families. Of all households, 8.5% were made up of individuals, and 3.7% had someone living alone who was 65 years of age or older. The average household size was 3.10, and the average family size was 3.27.

The age distribution of the population was 29.2% under the age of 18, 5.1% from 18 to 24, 15.9% from 25 to 44, 37.3% from 45 to 64, and 12.5% who were 65 years of age or older. The median age was 44.8 years. The gender makeup of the CDP was 50.3% male and 49.7% female.

The median income for a household in the CDP was $189,545, and the median income for a family was $201,250. Males had a median income of $149,609 versus $101,289 for females. The community's per capita income was $80,422. About 0.8% of families and 1.8% of the population were below the poverty line, including 0.7% of those under age 18 and 4.7% of those age 65 or over.

In 2010, the Census extended the CDP's western border from Springvale Road to the Fairfax-Loudoun County Line, expanding the CDP's area by approximately 40%. This extension partly explains the CDP's population increase of 80.5% since the 2000 Census.

Education
Fairfax County Public Schools operates the local public schools. Great Falls students attend Great Falls Elementary School, Forestville Elementary School or Colvin Run Elementary School. These schools feed into James Fenimore Cooper Middle School, which then feeds into Langley High School.

Siena Academy is a Catholic Montessori preschool and elementary school in Great Falls, under the authority of the Diocese of Arlington. It is the only private K-12 school in the town.

Fairfax County Public Library operates the Great Falls Library.

Infrastructure

Transportation
The main roads serving Great Falls are Virginia State Route 7 (Leesburg Pike) and Virginia State Route 193 (Georgetown Pike).

Parks and recreation
Although Great Falls is primarily a bedroom community for Washington, D.C., one major attraction is Great Falls Park which overlooks the Great Falls of the Potomac River, for which the community and the park are named. George Washington was involved with building a canal around the falls on the southwest, or Virginia, side, called the Patowmack Canal, which did not become commercially viable. Remnants of the canal and of a village around the canal named Matildaville are still visible in the park. The Great Falls and Old Dominion Railroad extended along Old Dominion Drive to Great Falls Park in 1906.

River Bend County Park is another gathering area in Great Falls, as is the Village Green, which hosts community celebrations around Easter (Spring Festival, including an Egg Hunt), Fourth of July, Halloween, Thanksgiving, and Christmas (Tree Lighting), as well as concerts in the summer.

In popular culture 
The MTV television series Finding Carter is partially set in Great Falls.

Notable people

Due to its proximity to Washington, D.C., several figures from American politics and government live or have lived in Great Falls, including Senator Rick Santorum, former United States Surgeon General Kenneth Moritsugu, Federal Bureau of Investigation director Louis Freeh and former Central Intelligence Agency director Stansfield Turner. Other famous residents have included Governor Glenn Youngkin, political commentator Peggy Noonan, heiress Jacqueline Mars, businessman Steve Case, and Washington Commanders owner Dan Snyder as well as astronaut Dan Tani.

See also

References

External links

 Great Falls Historical Society

Census-designated places in Fairfax County, Virginia
Census-designated places in Virginia
Virginia populated places on the Potomac River
Washington metropolitan area